Marc Dos Santos (born May 26, 1977) is a Canadian soccer coach who is an assistant coach for Los Angeles FC in Major League Soccer. He was previously the head coach of Montreal Impact in D2 Pro League and the Vancouver Whitecaps FC, was North American Soccer League Coach of the Year in 2015, when he led the Ottawa Fury FC to the North American Soccer League Championship Final after a first-place finish in the Fall Season, coached at Swope Park Rangers of United Soccer League, San Francisco Deltas of NASL and assistant coach of Los Angeles FC. Prior to that, he focused on youth initiatives in Brazil with FC Primeira Camisa (U-20's) and SE Palmeiras (U-15's), culminating with a Copa do Brasil Sub-15 championship and a technical director position with Desportivo Brasil.

Managerial career

Trois-Rivières Attak
In 2006, he managed the Lac St. Louis Lakers in the Ligue de Soccer Elite Quebec. On January 17, 2007, the Montreal native was first hired by the Montreal Impact in January 2007 to lead the club's reserve team, Trois-Rivières Attak, in the Canadian Soccer League. Under the guidance of Dos Santos, the club won the Open Canada Cup with a 3–0 victory in the final against the Columbus Clan F.C. In the league, they finished second in the National Division and reached the playoff semi-final, where they eventually lost against the Serbian White Eagles.

During the 2008 CSL season Dos Santos led the Attak to claim the National Division title, the first Division title to be won by the club.  For the second year in a row the Attak gained a playoff berth, eventually reaching the finals of the CSL Cup, where once again the Attak were defeated by White Eagles (this time on penalty kicks). On November 5, 2008, Dos Santos stepped down as head coach of Trois-Rivières.

Montreal Impact
In June 2008, Dos Santos became an assistant coach with the Montreal Impact first team under head coach John Limniatis. That year, the Impact won the inaugural Canadian Championship to claim a berth in the 2008–09 CONCACAF Champions League. In May 2009, Limniatis was fired and Dos Santos named as interim head coach. Later that year, Dos Santos was named head coach and remained in that position until his resignation on June 28, 2011. While head coach, Montreal won the USL First Division title in 2009.

Brazil
Dos Santos worked at three Brazilian clubs. On December 21, 2011, he was announced as the head coach of Primeira Camisa FC, which was then owned by World Cup champion Roque Junior. During his tenure, he achieved the best result in the club's history at Copa São Paulo de Futebol Júnior. In February 2012, Marc was hired by Palmeiras, one of Brazil's largest soccer teams, as its Youth Academy Coordinator. Brazilian journalist Paulinho ridiculed Dos Santos hire by announcing it together with the photo of a donkey and the phrase "he is from Canada, a real soccer powerhouse". Marc became the head coach of Palmeiras U-15 and won the youth championship in 2012, a competition that the club had never won before. Over six thousand Palmeiras fans watched the final at the stadium. Marc moved to Desportivo Brasil, where he held the posts of technical director and head coach for roughly one year before returning to North America in 2013.

Ottawa Fury FC
Ottawa Fury FC announced the signing of Dos Santos as the first ever manager of the new NASL franchise on May 23, 2013. On September 15, 2015, Ottawa Fury FC announced that coach Marc Dos Santos would be leaving the club at the end of 2015 season to join MLS. At the time Ottawa Fury FC was placed first in fall standings and third in overall standings for 2015 season. On November 11, 2015, Marc Dos Santos was named "NASL Coach of the Year" for 2015 by the NASL.

Swope Park Rangers
Dos Santos was introduced as the first manager to helm Swope Park Rangers, beginning in the 2016 season. He led the team to a fourth-place finish in the West  and to the USL Cup final.

San Francisco Deltas 
On August 17, 2016, Dos Santos was named as the first head coach of the San Francisco Deltas, beginning in the 2017 season. He led the Deltas to a 14–12–6 record—second-place in the table—and then to a 2–0 win over the New York Cosmos in the NASL Soccer Bowl to claim the league title. On November 17, 2017, Dos Santos resigned, shortly before the club ceased operations.

Vancouver Whitecaps FC 

Dos Santos was named as head coach of MLS's Vancouver Whitecaps FC after the team finished its 2018 season.
The club fired Dos Santos on August 27, 2021, after a 4–3 loss in the first round of the 2021 Canadian Championship to Canadian Premier League's Pacific FC; and after starting the MLS season with only five wins, seven draws and eight losses.

Personal life
A dual citizen of Canada and Portugal, Dos Santos holds a UEFA "A" coaching license, worked at both Chelsea F.C. and FC Porto and is fluent in four languages. He is the father of three children, with his ex-wife Marie. Marc is the older brother of soccer coach Phillip Dos Santos.

Managerial statistics

Honours 

 2007 Head coach – Open Canada Cup Champions
 2008 Head coach – Canadian Soccer League Division Champions
 2008 Head coach – Canadian Soccer League Regular Season Champions 
 2008 Head coach – Nomination for Coach of the Year
 2008 Assistant coach – Canadian Championship winner
 2008 Assistant coach – Quarter Finals of the CONCACAF Champions League
 2009 Head coach – USL Championship winner
 2009 Head coach – Nomination for Coach of the Year
 2010 Head coach – Semi–final of the USSF D2
 2012 Head coach – Brazilian Youth Champions U–15
 2015 Head coach – 2015 NASL Manager of the Year
 2015 Head coach – NASL Fall Season (Claussura) Champions 
 2015 Head coach – NASL Soccer Bowl runner–up
 2015 Head coach – League record: 648 consecutive minutes without conceding a goal. NASL League 
 2015 Head coach – League record: 14 matches without conceding a goal NASL 
 2015 Head coach – League record: 12 matches without losing away from home
 2016 Head coach – USL Western Conference Champions
 2016 Head coach – USL Championship runner–up
 2017 Head coach – 2017 NASL Manager of the Year
 2017 Head coach – 2017 NASL Soccer Bowl Championship Winner

References

1977 births
Canadian people of Portuguese descent
Canadian soccer coaches
Living people
Montreal Impact (1992–2011) coaches
Soccer people from Quebec
Sportspeople from Montreal
Trois-Rivières Attak coaches
Ottawa Fury FC coaches
North American Soccer League coaches
Sporting Kansas City non-playing staff
Canadian Soccer League (1998–present) managers
San Francisco Deltas
Sporting Kansas City II coaches
Los Angeles FC non-playing staff
Vancouver Whitecaps FC coaches